Marek is a West Slavic (Czech, Polish and Slovak) masculine given name, the equivalent of Mark in English. It is also the 46th most popular masculine given name in Estonian.
Notable people bearing the name Marek include:

Sports
Association football
 Marek Bakoš (born 1983), Slovak footballer 
 Marek Bęben (born 1958), Polish goalkeeper
 Marek Čech (Slovak footballer) (born 1983), Slovak footballer
 Marek Čech (Czech footballer) (born 1976), Czech footballer
 Marek Heinz (born 1977), Czech football striker 
 Marek Hamšík (born 1987), Slovak footballer
 Marek Hovorka (footballer) (born 1991), Czech footballer
 Marek Jankulovski (born 1977), Czech footballer 
 Marek Kaljumäe (born 1991), Estonian footballer 
 Marek Lemsalu (born 1972), Estonian footballer
 Marek Mintál (born 1977), Slovak footballer
 Marek Nikl (born 1976), Czech footballer
 Marek Saganowski (born 1978), Polish footballer
 Marek Szmid (born 1982), English footballer
 Marek Suchý (born 1988), Czech footballer
 Marek Zając (born 1973), Polish footballer
 Marek Zúbek (born 1975), Czech footballer

Ice hockey
 Marek Batkiewicz (born 1969), Polish ice hockey player
 Marek Černošek (born 1976), Czech ice hockey player
 Marek Cholewa (born 1963), Polish ice hockey player
 Marek Hovorka (ice hockey) (born 1984), Slovak ice hockey player
 Marek Langhamer (born 1994), Czech ice hockey player
 Marek Marušiak (born 1990), Slovak ice hockey player
 Marek Posmyk (born 1978), Czech ice hockey
 Marek Stebnicki (born 1965), Polish ice hockey player
 Marek Svatoš (1982–2016), Slovak ice hockey player 
 Marek Viedenský (born 1990), Slovak ice hockey player
 Marek Vorel (born 1977), Czech ice hockey player
 Marek Zachar (born 1998), Czech ice hockey player
 Marek Zagrapan (born 1986), Slovak ice hockey player
 Marek Židlický (born 1977), Czech ice hockey player

Other sports
 Marek Avamere (born 1970), Estonian rower
 Marek Bajan (born 1956), Polish pentathlete
 Marek Bílek (born 1973), Czech discus thrower
 Marek Cieślak (born 1950), Polish speedway rider and coach
 Marek Deska (born 1985), Polish-Canadian baseball player, pitcher and Leon's inventory
 Marek Daćko (born 1991), Polish handball player 
 Marek Doronin (born 1983), Estonian basketball player
 Marek Galiński (cyclist) (1974–2014), Polish mountain biker and road racing cyclist
 Marek Garmulewicz (born 1968), Polish former wrestler 
 Marek Gniewkowski (born 1965), Polish fencer
 Marek Gołąb (1940–2017), Polish weightlifter
 Marek Jóźwik (born 1947), Polish hurdler
 Marek Kaleta (born 1961), Estonian javelin thrower
 Marek Karbarz (born 1950), Polish volleyball player
 Marek Kolbowicz (born 1971), Polish rower
 Marek Krawczyk (born 1976), Polish breaststroke swimmer
 Marek Maslanka, Polish slalom canoeist 
 Marek Minařík (born 1993), Czech baseball pitcher
 Marek Niit (born 1972), Estonian sprinter
 Marek Noormets (born 1971), Estonian basketball player
 Marek Piotrowski (born 1964), Polish heavyweight kickboxer and boxer 
 Marek Rutkiewicz (born 1981), Polish road racing cyclist 
 Marek Sikora (ice hockey) (born 1986), Czech ice hockey player
 Marek Sitnik (born 1975), Polish Greco-Roman wrestler
 Marek Stępień (born 1964), Polish fencer
 Marek Švec (wrestler) (born 1973), Czech wrestler 
 Marek Ulrich (born 1997), German swimmer
 Marek Uram (born 1974), Slovak ice hockey player
 Marek Witkowski (born 1974), Polish sprint canoer
 Marek Wrona (born 1966), Polish racing cyclist

Others
 Marek Balt (born 1973), Polish politician, economist 
 Marek Biliński (born 1953), Polish composer of electronic music
 Marek Beer (born 1988), Czech volleyball player.
 Marek Borowski (born 1946), Polish politician
 Marek Kac (1914–1984), Polish-American mathematician
 Marek Całka (born 1966), Polish civil servant and career diplomat 
 Marek Jan Chodakiewicz (born 1962), Polish-American historian specializing in Central European history
 Marek Djordjevic (born 1969), Serbian automobile designer 
 Marek Edelman (1919 or 1922–2009), Jewish-Polish political and social activist, cardiologist, and the longest living leader of the Warsaw Ghetto Uprising
 Marek Gazdzicki (born 1956), Polish nuclear physicist, the initiator and spokesperson of the NA61 Shine Experiment
 Marek Gatty-Kostyal (1886–1965), Polish chemist and pharmacist
 Marek Grechuta (1945–2006), Polish musician and songwriter
 Marek Halter (born 1936), Polish-French writer and activist
 Marek Hłasko (1934–1969), Polish author and screenwriter
 Marek Huberath (born 1954), Polish professor of physics
 Marek Jastrzębiec-Mosakowski (born 1962), Polish author
 Marek Jiras (born 1976), Czech slalom canoeist 
 Marek Jürgenson (born 1977), Estonian politician
 Marek Kalbus (born 1969), German opera and concert singer
 Marek Kawa (born 1975), Polish politician
 Marek Kohn, British science writer on evolution, biology and society
 Marek Kondrat (born 1950), Polish actor and director
 Marek Kukula (born 1969), British astronomer
 Marek Larwood (born 1976), English comedian and actor
 Marek Łatas (born 1960), Polish politician
 Marek Napiórkowski (born 1969), Polish jazz guitarist and composer
 Marek Olędzki born (1951), Polish archaeologist
 Marek Opioła (born 1976), Polish politician
 Marek Oramus (born 1952), Polish science fiction writer
 Marek Pavelec (born 1989), Czech solo violinist
 Marek Marian Piątek (born 1954), Polish-born bishop in the Catholic Church
 Marek Rosa (born 1979), Slovak video game producer and designer
 Marek Sanak (born 1958), Polish geneticist and molecular biologist, professor of medical sciences
 Marek Šindler (born 1992), Czech slalom canoeist 
 Marek Sikora (actor) (1959-1996), Polish film actor and theatre director
 Marek Sikora (astronomer), Polish astronomer
 Marek Strandberg (born 1965), Estonian materials scientist, businessman, caricaturist and politician 
 Marek Štryncl, Czech conductor, violoncellist, choirmaster and composer
 Marek Surin, Slovak record producer, mixer, engineer, writer and musician
 Marek Trojanowicz (born 1944), Polish chemist, professor of chemical sciences
 Marek W. Urban, American professor, polymer and materials scientist
 Marek Wielgus (1950–1996), Polish sports activist, photographer, and Sejm deputy 
 Marek Wolf (born 1957), Czech astronomer
 Marek Zalewski (archbishop) (born 1963), Polish prelate of the Catholic Church
 Marek Żukow-Karczewski (born 1961), Polish historian, journalist, and author
 Marek Żuławski (1908–1985), London-based Polish painter, graphic artist and art historian
 Marek Zvelebil (1952–2011), Czech-Dutch archaeologist and prehistorian

See also
 Marek

References